Kottaimedu Mosque or  Kottai Hidayathul Islam Safia Jamath Mosque is a mosque in Kottaimedu within the Coimbatore district of Tamil Nadu in India, about 1 km away from Coimbatore railway station.

History

The original mosque was built in 1776 under Tipu Sultan as part of a fort. After its destruction during the British rule, Haji Mohammed Pillai Rawther arranged for a new mosque to be built between 1901 and 1910. He was buried next to the mosque, and a nearby street was named after him. His son-in-law Haji Meera Pillai Rowther succeeded him in maintaining the mosque.

A number of casualties from the 1921 Malabar Rebellion against the British were buried here.

Lena Mohammad Rawuthar became first president of the mosque in 1924 and was responsible for constructing facilities for Islamic education.

The Mosque was registered under 'Act XXI of 1860' on 2 May 1924 and a management was formed by the following 21 members of the administration. The document was signed by 195 members of the congregation.

 Haji M.M.Mohammed Meideen Rowther,
 Lena Mohammed Rowther,
 S.M.Ismail Rowther,
 M.M.Mohammed Ali Rowther,
 M.M.Vellaiyappa Rowther,
 Haji M.M.Mohammed Ibrahim Rowther,
 S.P.Mohammed Maraikayar Rowther,
 A.M.Fakeer Mohammed Rowther,
 Haji S.Hasan Kadhar Rowther,
 A.S.Mohammed Aliyar Rowther,
 A.M.Mohammed Yusuf Rowther,
 T.A.Hasan Kadhar Rowther,
 M.A.Mohammed Saibu Rowther,
 Haji S.K.Kadhar Saibu Rowther,
 S.Syed Kutty Rowther,
 Haji K.Syed Mohammed Rowther,
 Haji S.Syed Ahamed Rowther,
 A.P.Mohammed Rowther,
 V.Abdul Kadhar Rowther,
 K.Kidhar Rowther,
 T.Kadhar Meideen Rowther.

References

Mosques in Tamil Nadu
Mosques completed in 1776
Coimbatore district